Three Bold Siblings is a 2023 South Korean television series starring Lee Ha-na, Lim Ju-hwan, Lee Tae-sung, Kim Seung-soo, Kim So-eun and Lee You-jin. It premiered on KBS2 on September 24, 2022, and aired every Saturday and Sunday at 20:00 (KST).

Synopsis
A story about K-first daughter Kim Tae-joo (Lee Ha-na) and top star K-first son Lee Sang-joon (Lim Ju-hwan) seeking happiness.

Cast

Main
 Lee Ha-na as Kim Tae-joo 
She is pleasant and lenient, however she likewise has a hot attitude. She removes associations with individuals whom she could do without.
 Lim Ju-hwan as Lee Sang-joon
 Go Kyung-min as young Lee Sang-joon  
He is a famous entertainer. He is delicate, innovative, and savvy. He is likewise the oldest kin in his loved ones. Since he was a youngster, he has been cherished by his family profoundly. His family was once in the red, yet, after Lee Sang-joon became effective, he took care of their obligation and keeps on supporting them monetarily. During shooting for an acting task, Lee Sang-joon gets harmed and goes to the emergency clinic.
 Lee Tae-sung as Cha Yun-ho
A documentary director called 'Wild Horse'. He has a cool personality, blunt, brave, and has no intention of getting married. He was a man who experienced a change in the values ​​of marriage through many meetings with the person.
 Kim Seung-soo as Shin Mu-young
Director of a small and medium-sized company. Mo-young graduated with a master's degree in Chemistry. He is a kind person and does not get angry, has a logical approach to dealing with problems. 
 Kim So-eun as Kim So-rim
The middle child of the Kim family and Kim Tae-joo's younger sister. A friendly and sociable person who gets along well with her sister. Kim So-rim is a beautiful pilates instructor whose sunny personality attracts others.
 Lee You-jin as Kim Gun-woo
The youngest son and a doctor at the general hospital. However, when he gets caught up in an unexpected love affair in his life, he gets into a mess.

Supporting

People around the three siblings
 Jung Jae-soon as Choi Mal-soon 
The grandmother of three siblings, has a clean and strict personality. She doesn't like Tae Joo. 
 Lee Kyung-jin as Yoo Jung-suk
Mother of three siblings and a strong and honest person. But feel sadness for Tae Joo. 
 Song Seung-hwan as Kim Hae-bok
Chef of 'Today's Curry' and father of Gun-Woo & So-Rim & Stepfather of Tae-Joo, has a warm and loving personality.

People around Lee Sang-joon
 Kim Yong-rim as Yoon Gap-bun 
Lee Sang-joon and Lee Sang-min's grandmother, Jang Se-ran's mother.
 Chang Mi-hee as Jang Se-ran
Lee Sang-joon and Lee Sang-min's mother. She is not only beautiful and sophisticated but also smart-headed with artistic flair and business acumen, never give up.
 Wang Bit-na as Jang Hyun-jung
University professor, columnist, fashion content creator and bright and groundbreaking who are often indifferent, but shows a desire to win when she is obsessed with it.
 Moon Ye-won as Lee Sang-min 
Lee Sang-joon's younger sister.
 Min Sung-wook as Jang Young-sik 
 Cousin of Lee Sang-joon's mother. Son of brother of Yoon Gap-bun. 
 Jung Soo-young as Na Eun-joo 
She is the cousin of eldest son Lee Sang-joon and is a hard worker who runs a photo studio with her husband and oversees management, public relations, renting clothes and even cleaning.
 Ryu Ui-hyun as Jang Soo-bin 
Bright personality and optimistic simplicity that makes life enjoyable. He is a source of energy. He is cousin of Lee Sang-joon & Lee Sung Min.
 Jung Woo-jin as Jang Ji-woo
Jang Young-sik's second son & brother of Soo-Bin. He is the fifth cousin of Lee Sang-joon & Lee Sung Min.

Others
 Kim Ji-an as Shin Ji-hye 
The daughter of a wealthy family who is emotionally honest and doesn't know the world.
 Yang Dae-hyuk as Jo Nam-soo 
Employee who tend to work in large companies. Boyfriend of So-Rim who is cheating her.
 Oh Ha-nee as Min Yu-ri 
The only daughter of a wealthy family full of cuteness. Girlfriend of Gun-Woo who is cheating him.
 Jang Hee-jung as Hoo Yong-sil 
Former nurse Kim Tae-joo's medical school classmate and best friend.

Extended
 Jeon No-min as Kim Myung-jae 
 Kim Tae-joo's uncle.
 Go On as Bae Dong-chan  
Lee Sang-min's boyfriend, an actor who pretends to be a prosecutor to marry Lee Sang-min. He cheats on Sang-Min on their wedding day. 
 Han Ji-wan as The person who threw an egg at Tae-joo
She used to bully Tae-joo.
 Lee Se-young as Streamer
A suspicious TV streamer that Tae-joo saw.
 Cha Ji-hoon as Hong Seok 
 The actor cast in the drama 'Black & White'.
 Lee Ki-taek as Won Ji-hoon 
 He is the best friend of Cha Yun-ho and works with him.
 Lee Seung-hyung as Wang Seung-goo
 Sang-joon's manager.
 Jung Gun-joo as Actor
 Drama actor Sang-joon is playing.
 Park Hee-soo as Jang Jae-won  
 Jang Se-ran's Korean-American grandson.
 Ahn Ji-hye as Lee Jang-mi
 Kim Kyung-hwa as Oh Hee-eun
 The ex-wife of Shin Mu-young.
 Kim Seon-hwa as Young-shik's mother

Production
The series, written by Kim In-young, is planned by KBS Drama Division and produced by GnG Productions. The first script reading of the cast was held in August 2022.

Viewership

Awards and nominations

Notes

References

External links
  
 
 
 

Korean Broadcasting System television dramas
2022 South Korean television series debuts
2023 South Korean television series endings
Korean-language television shows
South Korean comedy-drama television series
Television series about families